Stanfield is an unincorporated community in far northeastern Clay County, Texas, United States. Located on Farm to Market Road 2332, Stanfield lies 15 miles northeast of Henrietta and about one mile south of the Oklahoma border.

History
The townsite was originally a part of the Stanfield Brothers Ranch and never really thrived as an independent town; however, it did operate a post office under the town's name from 1903-1905 and reported a population of 50 through most of the 20th Century.  The population, mostly ranch hands, farmers, or other employees of the town's founders, lived in quiet isolation in the far northeastern corner of the county, particularly prior to FM 2332's improvement in 1960. Though less than two miles away from the city center, the Oklahoma town of Ryan nevertheless remains unconnected to the Stanfield area because of the Red River and residents must travel much further to Henrietta, Petrolia, or Byers to conduct business.  No businesses, schools, or post office remain in Stanfield.

References

Unincorporated communities in Texas
Unincorporated communities in Clay County, Texas
Wichita Falls metropolitan area